The Ardennes, also known as the Ardennes Forest or Forest of Ardennes, is a region of extensive forests, rough terrain, rolling hills and ridges primarily in Belgium and Luxembourg, extending into Germany and France. Geologically, the range is a western extension of the Eifel; both were raised during the Givetian age of the Devonian (382.7 to 387.7 million years ago), as were several other named ranges of the same greater range.

The Ardennes proper stretches well into Germany and France (lending its name to the Ardennes department and the former Champagne-Ardenne region) and geologically into the Eifel (the eastern extension of the Ardennes Forest into Bitburg-Prüm, Germany); most of it is in the southeast of Wallonia, the southern and more rural part of Belgium (away from the coastal plain but encompassing more than half of the country's total area). The eastern part of the Ardennes forms the northernmost third of the Grand Duchy of Luxembourg, also called "Oesling". On the southeast the Eifel region continues into the German state of the Rhineland-Palatinate.

The trees and rivers of the Ardennes provided the charcoal industry assets that enabled the great industrial period of Wallonia in the 18th and 19th centuries, when it was arguably the second great industrial region of the world. The greater region maintained an industrial eminence into the 20th century, after coal replaced charcoal in metallurgy.

Geography

The region is typified by steep-sided valleys carved by swift-flowing rivers, the most prominent of which is the Meuse. Its most populous cities are Verviers in Belgium and Charleville-Mézières in France, both exceeding 50,000 inhabitants. The Ardennes is otherwise relatively sparsely populated, with few of the cities exceeding 10,000 inhabitants. (Exceptions include Belgium's Eupen and Bastogne.)

The Eifel range in Germany adjoins the Ardennes and is part of the same geological formation, although they are conventionally regarded as being two distinct areas.

Highest summits 
 Signal de Botrange , Liège Province, Belgium - highest point in the Ardennes, highest point in the Benelux countries
 Weißer Stein , Mürringen, Liège Province, Belgium
 Baraque Michel , Liège Province, Belgium
 Baraque de Fraiture, highest point of the Plateau des Tailles, Luxembourg Province, Belgium
 Lieu-dit (=place called) Galata, highest point on the Plateau de Saint-Hubert, Luxembourg Province, Belgium
 Kneiff, highest point in the nation of Luxembourg (Grand Duchy of Luxembourg)
 Buurgplaatz, highest point in the Oesling section of the Ardennes, Grand Duchy of Luxembourg
 Napoléonsgaard, near Rambrouch, Grand Duchy of Luxembourg
 Croix Scaille , on the border of the provinces of Namur, Belgium, and Champagne, France

Geology

The Ardennes are the remnants of a mountain range formed during the Hercynian orogeny; in France similar formations are the Armorican Massif, the Massif Central, and the Vosges. The low interior of such former mountains often contains coal, plus iron, zinc and other metals in the sub-soil. This geologic fact explains the greatest part of the geography of Wallonia and its history. In the North and West of the Ardennes lie the valleys of the Sambre and Meuse rivers, forming an arc (Sillon industriel) going across the most industrial provinces of Wallonia, for example Hainaut Province, along the river Haine (the etymology of Hainaut); the Borinage, the Centre and Charleroi along the river Sambre; Liège Province along the river Meuse.

The region was uplifted by a mantle plume during the last few hundred thousand years, as measured from the present elevation of old river terraces.

This geological region is important in the history of Wallonia because this former mountain is at the origin of the economy, the history, and the geography of Wallonia. "Wallonia presents a wide range of rocks of various ages. Some geological stages internationally recognized were defined from rock sites located in Wallonia: e.g. Frasnian (Frasnes-lez-Couvin), Famennian (Famenne), Tournaisian (Tournai), Visean (Visé), Dinantian (Dinant) and Namurian (Namur)". Except for the Tournaisian, all these rocks are within the Ardennes geological area.

Economy
The Ardennes includes the greatest part of Belgium's Luxembourg Province (not to be confused with the neighbouring Grand Duchy of Luxembourg), the south of Namur Province, and Liège Province, plus a very small part of Hainaut Province, as well as the northernmost third of the Grand Duchy of Luxembourg, called Oesling and the main part of the French Ardennes department.

Before the 19th century industrialization, the first furnaces in these four Belgian provinces (all in the Wallonia region) and in the French Ardennes used charcoal for fuel, made from harvesting the Ardennes forest. This industry was also in the extreme south of present-day Luxembourg Province (which until 1839 was part of the Grand Duchy of Luxembourg), in the region called Gaume. The most important part of the Walloon steel industry, using coal, was built around the coal mines, mainly in the region around the cities of Liège, Charleroi, La Louvière, the Borinage, and further in the Walloon Brabant (in Tubize). Wallonia became the second industrial power area of the world (after Great Britain) in proportion to its territory and to its population (see further).

The rugged terrain and the harsh climate of the Ardennes limits the scope for agriculture; arable and dairy farming in cleared areas form the mainstay of the agricultural economy. The region is rich in timber and minerals, and Liège and the city of Namur are both major industrial centres. The extensive forests have an abundant population of wild game. The scenic beauty of the region and its wide variety of outdoor activities, including hunting, cycling, walking and canoeing, make it a popular tourist destination.

Etymology
The region takes its name from the vast ancient forest known as Arduenna Silva in the Roman Period. The second element is less certain, but may be related to the Celtic element *windo- as in the Welsh wyn/wen ("fair", "blessed"), which tentatively suggests an original meaning of "The forest of blessed/fair heights".

The Ardennes likely shares this derivation with the numerous Arden place names in Britain, including the Forest of Arden.

History

The modern Ardennes region covers a greatly diminished area from the forest recorded in Roman times.

A song about Charlemagne, the Old French 12th-century chanson de geste Quatre Fils Aymon, mentions many of Wallonia's rivers, villages and other places. In Dinant the rock named Bayard takes its name for Bayard, the magic bay horse which, according to legend, jumped from the top of the rock to the other bank of the Meuse.

On their pillaging raids in the years 881 and 882, the Vikings used the old Roman roads in the Ardennes and attacked the abbeys of Malmedy and Stablo and destroyed Prüm Abbey in the Eifel.

The strategic position of the Ardennes has made it a battleground for European powers for centuries. Much of the Ardennes formed part of the Duchy (since 1815, the Grand Duchy) of Luxembourg, a member state of the Holy Roman Empire, which changed hands numerous times between the powerful dynasties of Europe. In 1793 revolutionary France annexed the whole area, together with all other territories west of the Rhine river. In 1815, the Congress of Vienna, which dealt with the political aftermath of the Napoleonic Wars, restored the previous geographical situation, with most of the Ardennes becoming part of the Grand Duchy of Luxembourg. After the revolution of 1830, which resulted in the establishment of the Kingdom of Belgium, the political future of the Ardennes became a matter of much dispute between Belgium, Luxembourg, and the Netherlands, as well as involving the contemporary great powers of France, Prussia, and Great Britain. As a result, in 1839, the Grand Duchy of Luxembourg ceded the westernmost 63% of its territory (being also the main part of the Ardennes) to the new Kingdom of Belgium, which is now its Luxembourg Province.

In the 20th century the Ardennes was widely thought by leading military strategists to be unsuitable for large-scale military operations, due to its difficult terrain and narrow lines of communications. However, in both World War I and World War II, Germany successfully gambled on making a rapid passage through the Ardennes to attack a relatively lightly defended part of France. The Ardennes became the site of three major battles during the world wars—the Battle of the Ardennes (August 1914) in World War I, and the Battle of France (1940) and the Battle of the Bulge (1944–1945) in World War II. Many of the towns of the region suffered severe damage during the two world wars.

Allied generals in World War II believed that the region was impenetrable to massed vehicular traffic and especially armor, so the area was effectively "all but undefended" during the war. The German Army twice used this region to invade northern France and southern Belgium, via Luxembourg in the Battle of France and the later Battle of the Bulge.

The military strategists of Nazi Germany in 1939 and 1940 selected the forest as the primary route of their mechanized forces in the Invasion of France. The forest's great size could conceal the armored divisions, and because the French did not suspect that the Germans would make such a risky move, they did not consider a breakthrough there, or considered that it would take at least 15 days for an army to pass through the forest. German forces, primarily under the command of Erich von Manstein, carried out the plan in two days, and managed to slip numerous divisions past the Maginot Line to attack France from the north, and rout the French forces. 
In May 1940 the German army crossed the Meuse, despite the resistance of the French Army. Under the command of General Heinz Guderian, the German armoured divisions crossed the river at Dinant and at Sedan, France. This was a crucial step in the push towards Paris, and France fell on 25 June 1940.

At the other end of the war, the Ardennes area came to prominence again during the Battle of the Bulge. The German Army, which had been forced to retreat for some time, launched a surprise attack in December 1944 in an attempt to recapture Antwerp and to drive a wedge between the advancing British and American forces in northern France. After a fierce battle the Allied forces blocked the German advance on the river Meuse at Dinant.In the postwar period, the Ardennes has become a weekend retreat that is popular among both Belgians and the neighboring countries. The tourist industry is extensive and varied in range of activities and type of accommodations.

Gallery

See also
 Flemish Ardennes, an unconnected region in East Flanders

References

Sources
 Gerrard, John, Mountain Environments: An Examination of the Physical Geography of Mountains, MIT Press, 1990

 
Rhenish Massif
Old-growth forests
Forests of Belgium
Forests of France
Forests of Luxembourg
Areas of Belgium
Regions of Wallonia
History of Wallonia
Mountain ranges of Belgium
Mountain ranges of Luxembourg
Mountain ranges of Grand Est
Mountain ranges of Hauts-de-France
Landforms of Wallonia
Landforms of Hainaut (province)
Landforms of Liège Province
Landforms of Luxembourg (Belgium)
Landforms of Namur (province)
Landforms of Ardennes (department)
Landforms of Nord (French department)
Natural regions of Belgium
Divided regions